Kari Kyösti Väänänen (born 17 September 1953 in Ivalo) is a Finnish actor and director. Domestically he is a member of the Ryhmäteatteri group of actors. He was introduced to international audiences by Aki Kaurismäki, and belongs to the list of his "trusted" stable of actors.

Väänänen has acted in more than 60 movies. He has received two Jussi awards, for best male actor in Jon (1983) and for best supporting male actor in Trench Road (2004). 
His performance as the monster Gollum in Yle's 1993 television series Hobitit was praised in Helsingin Sanomat.

In 1992–1998 Väänänen was a professor at the Helsinki Theatre Academy.

Selected filmography 

As actor
 Jon (1983)
 The Clan – Tale of the Frogs (1984)
 Calamari Union (1985)
 Rosso (1985)
 Helsinki Napoli All Night Long (1987)
 Leningrad Cowboys Go America (1989)
 Amazon (1990)
 Night on Earth (1991)
 La Vie de Bohème (1992)
 The Last Border (1993)
 Hobitit (1993)
 Ripa Hits the Skids (1993)
 Drifting Clouds (1996)
 Trains'n'Roses (1998)
 The Tough Ones (1999)
 Ambush (1999)
 Sincerely Yours in Cold Blood (10 episodes, 2000–2005)
 Bad Luck Love (2000)
 Trench Road (2004)
 Star Wreck: In the Pirkinning (2005)
 V2: Dead Angel (V2 – Jäätynyt enkeli, 2007)
 Joulutarina (2007)
 The House of Branching Love (Haarautuvan rakkauden talo, 2009)
 A Spice for Life (Mestari Cheng, 2019)

As director

 The Quiet Village (Vaiennut kylä, 1997)
 The Classic (Klassikko, 2001)
 Backwood Philosopher (Havukka-ahon ajattelija, 2009)

References

External links 
 

1953 births
Living people
People from Inari, Finland
Finnish male television actors
Finnish film directors
Finnish male film actors
Finnish television directors
Finnish screenwriters
Finnish television writers
20th-century Finnish male actors
21st-century Finnish male actors
Male television writers
Academic staff of the University of the Arts Helsinki